The Stolen Professor (German: Der gestohlene Professor) is a 1924 German silent film directed by Emil Justitz and starring Olaf Fjord, Camilla von Hollay and Kläre Grieger.

The film's sets were designed by Otto Erdmann and Hans Sohnle.

Cast
 Olaf Fjord 
 Camilla von Hollay 
 Kläre Grieger 
 Sabri Mahir 
 Eugen Rex 
 Frida Richard 
 Karl Platen 
 Otto Kronburger 
 Ernst Rückert 
 Hugo Flink 
 Hans Junkermann

References

External links

1924 films
Films of the Weimar Republic
Films directed by Emil Justitz
German silent feature films
Films based on Austrian novels
German black-and-white films